Old Main Street Historic District is a nationally recognized historic district located in Dubuque, Iowa, United States. It was listed on the National Register of Historic Places in 1983. At the time of its nomination it consisted of 33 resources, which included 30 contributing buildings and three non-contributing buildings. In 2015 the boundaries were increased to include five more buildings. Four of the buildings are contributing properties that were excluded from the original district because they were slated to be torn down as a part of the expansion of U.S. Route 61. While the highway was built the buildings were spared. The fifth building is non-contributing as are three structures.

This is primarily a commercial area located immediately south of the central business district. Originally, this is where the city's commercial district was located because of its proximity to the ferry and riverboat landings. After 1860 most of the larger retail businesses, banks, and professional offices moved further north on Main Street, and new wholesale businesses moved here and built new structures. The buildings are all constructed in brick and are between three and four stories tall. It is considered to be the "largest concentration of significant nineteenth-century commercial architecture" in Dubuque. The Bishop's Block (1887) and the German Bank (1901) are individually listed on the National Register, and the Hotel Julien Dubuque (1914) is also a contributing building.

See also
National Register of Historic Places listings in Dubuque County, Iowa

References

National Register of Historic Places in Dubuque, Iowa
Historic districts in Dubuque, Iowa
Historic districts on the National Register of Historic Places in Iowa